The short western round open (changed to short metric round open in 1976). Both men and women competed in this event.

Men's short western round open

Men's short metric round paraplegic

Men's short metric round tetraplegic

Men's short western round team open

Women's short western round open 

Defunct events at the Summer Paralympics
Archery at the Summer Paralympics